Muhammad Aqil Irfanuddin bin Mohamad Sabri (born 3 April 1997) is a Malaysian footballer who plays for Terengganu in the Malaysia Super League as a defender.

References

External links
 

1997 births
Living people
Malaysian footballers
Association football defenders
Terengganu F.C. II players